The Professional Psychology: Research and Practice is a peer-reviewed, English language journal published six times per year by the American Psychological Association (APA).  The journal "publishes conceptual and data-based articles on the issues and methods involved in the practice of psychology. Topics encompass a broad range, including health psychology, community psychology, family psychology, forensic psychology, and clinical neuropsychology". The editor-in-chief is Ronald T. Brown (University of North Texas at Dallas).

First published in 1970, as Professional Psychology, the name of the journal was extended to Professional Psychology: Research and Practice in 1983.

The journal has implemented the Transparency and Openness Promotion (TOP) Guidelines.  The TOP Guidelines provide structure to research planning and reporting and aim to make research more transparent, accessible, and reproducible.

Abstracting and indexing 
According to the Journal Citation Reports, the journal has a 2020 impact factor of 1.716.

References

American Psychological Association academic journals
Publications established in 1970
Applied psychology journals
Psychotherapy journals
Professionalism